Sabattini is a surname. Notable people with the surname include:

Amadeo Sabattini (1892–1960), Argentine politician
Rory Sabbatini (born 1976), South African-born Slovakian golfer
Sandra Sabattini (1961–1984), Italian Roman Catholic

See also
Sabatini (surname)